Needham B. Broughton High School, commonly known as Broughton High School, is one of thirty-two high schools in the Wake County Public School System. It is located at 723 St. Mary's Street, Raleigh, North Carolina, United States. Broughton was named after businessman and politician, Needham B. Broughton, who contributed much to the public schools of the Raleigh area. Broughton is known for its castle-like stone facade design and tall bell tower. The architect was William Henley Deitrick.

History
Needham B. Broughton High School was established in 1929 as Raleigh High School. It is the oldest high school in Raleigh still being used. Shortly after it was built, C. B. Edwards sent a letter to the Raleigh Public School Board, requesting that the school—then without an official name—be named for Needham B. Broughton in honor of his service to public education in the city. The renaming ceremony took place in 1930, towards the end of the school year.

In 1935, Henry Watson Moore wrote a class song for his graduation, which later became Broughton's alma mater. Broughton's Queen of Hearts dance began in 1943, in an effort to raise funds for World War II. In 1957 during the Civil Rights Movement, Martin Luther King Jr. spoke in the school's former auditorium. Broughton was originally an all-white segregated school. In 1971, it became fully integrated. In 1989, Broughton's 3,000 seat Capital Stadium opened. In 2009, President Barack Obama visited the school.

Academics
Broughton offers 16 Advanced Placement (AP) courses as well as 28 International Baccalaureate (IB) courses. The school offers four foreign languages: French, German,  Mandarin and Spanish. The school runs on a 4x4 modified block schedule (A Day-B Day which allows students to go a whole semester without missing a "core class" or a foreign language).

Athletics
Broughton's sports teams play under the name "Capitals", sometimes shortened to "Caps". The school offers a variety of different sports teams (the newest of which are the lacrosse and gymnastic teams) that compete in the North Carolina High School Athletic Association (NCHSAA) 4A classification. The Capitals are members of the CAP 6 4A conference. Broughton's main sports facilities are the 3,000-seat Capital Stadium and the Holliday Gymnasium.

Broughton's historical rival is Enloe High School.

Arts
Broughton has a band, orchestra, chorus, and dance program, among other groups. The "Carolina Spirit" show choir was known as the top show choir in the country during the 1990s, winning six consecutive Showstoppers National/International Championships. In 2007 the drama department produced Lorraine Hansberry's 1959 Broadway play A Raisin in the Sun. In 2015 the drama team put on The Ugly Duckling at the Scotland Theater Festival.

Band
Broughton's award-winning band program has attended the 2008 and 2012 Tournament of Roses Parades. The 186 member band was one of fifteen bands selected to participate for the 2008 parade, and one of only six high schools. They were invited to march at the Inaugural Parade for N.C. Governor Bev Perdue. The Jazz I group also performed for President Barack Obama during his visit to Raleigh on July 29, 2009. Broughton also has a concert band, a symphonic wind ensemble, and a jazz band that performed for Jay Leno in 2011 and has made other appearances in Raleigh's "Pieces of Gold" at Memorial Auditorium, and played in Cameron Village's Chick-fil-A and Noodles restaurants.

Publications
Broughton's publications program includes the annual yearbook and newspaper. The yearbook is named the "Latipac" which is "Capital" (Broughton's mascot) spelled backwards. The school newspaper, the "Hi-Times", is published and distributed several times a year. Articles are also published on the Hi-Times website.

Dance
Students from Broughton's Dance Program regularly perform throughout the country and at arts functions around the state. They put on several concerts each year, including a benefit concert in December which is completely produced by the Broughton Dance Company. In 2017, the Broughton Dance Director, Betsy Graves, was named Wake County Public School System Teacher of the Year.

Community service
Students are required to perform 25 hours of service each year within the community. Students can also participate in service trips to Guatemala (Proyecto Quetzal) and in projects such as a school-sponsored Habitat for Humanity house.

Technology
Broughton is serviced by the adjacent Wade Edwards Learning Lab (WELL), a program established by former Senator John Edwards that provides after-school access to computers. Broughton's graphics department has also received an update.

From 2002 to 2004 Broughton underwent a $14 million renovation in which much of the school was gutted and refitted with state-of-the-art technology and new interiors. During the 2004–2005 school year Broughton received an additional $5 million to renovate its Holliday Gymnasium (the state's largest high school gym). One of the highlights of the renovations was the refurbishment of the newly titled Diane Payne Auditorium, named after the retired veteran principal.

WCAP
Broughton broadcasts its morning announcements via a closed-circuit network, headquartered from the WCAP media studio in the library. WCAP was founded in 1992 as a monthly, pre-recorded news production informing students of events happening around Broughton. By 1993 it had become a live, daily show broadcast from the media center. The set has undergone many renovations throughout the years, and WCAP celebrated its twentieth birthday on January 30, 2012.

In popular culture
The music video for the 1993 song "'74–'75" by The Connells features members of the Broughton High School Class of 1975 as they appeared in 1993 with juxtaposed images of their senior pictures. An update to the video was done in 2015.
Band members of The Connells who graduated from Broughton are bassist David Connell and former drummer for The Connells, Peele Wimberly.

Broughton High School is featured heavily in the popular satirical website ITB Insider, written primarily under the pseudonym of William Needham Finley IV (the middle name, Needham, echoing the first name in the full Needham Broughton High School).

Notable alumni

Nida Allam, politician
Christopher Brook, judge on the North Carolina Court of Appeals
Juston Burris, NFL cornerback
Paul Coble, former Mayor of Raleigh
John W. Coffey, author, art historian, Deputy Director for Collections at the North Carolina Museum of Art
Grady Cooper, Emmy nominated film editor
Junius Coston, NFL offensive guard
David Connell, bassist for pop rock group The Connells
Allison Dahle, Member of the North Carolina House of Representatives
Lelynd Darkes, rapper
Chris Dillon, North Carolina attorney and judge
Aubrey Dollar, actress and sister of Caroline
Caroline Dollar, actress and sister of Aubrey
Cate Edwards, attorney; daughter of former Sen. John Edwards
Jim Farmer, long distance track runner
Colin Fickes, actor
Stormie Forte, first African-American woman and first openly LGBTQ woman to serve on the Raleigh City Council
Jim Fulghum, neurosurgeon and former member of the North Carolina House of Representatives
Devonte Graham, NBA player
Scott Goodwin, professional soccer goalkeeper
Scott Hoch, professional golfer and Ryder Cup member
Herb Jackson, painter
Carl James, former commissioner of the Big Eight Conference
Richard Jenrette, Wall Street businessman and co-founder of the Donaldson, Lufkin & Jenrette firm
Bjørn Johnsen, professional soccer player
Nick Karner, actor and director
Lauren Kennedy, actress and singer who has performed on Broadway
Forrest Lasso, professional soccer player
Sharon Lawrence, actress best known for her role of Sylvia Costas Sipowicz in NYPD Blue
Beth Leavel, Tony Award-winning stage and screen actress
Pete Maravich, former LSU and NBA basketball player
Armistead Maupin, writer of Tales of the City a series of novels
Burley Mitchell, former Chief Justice of the North Carolina Supreme Court
Greg Murphy, congressman representing North Carolina's Third Congressional District
Casey Nogueira, professional women's soccer player, also a former member of U.S. women's U-20 soccer team
Oscar F. Peatross, highly decorated officer in the United States Marine Corps with the rank of major general
Danny Peebles, former NFL wide receiver
Sidney Powell, attorney, writer and media personality
Reynolds Price, writer, educator, and NPR radio host
Shavlik Randolph, professional basketball player who played in the NBA
Peyton Reed, television and film director
Jerome Robinson, NBA player
Jim Roland, MLB pitcher
Hunter Schafer, model, actress, and LGBT rights activist, known for her role as Jules in the HBO television series Euphoria
Jeremy Shelley, American football kicker
Webb Simpson, PGA Tour golfer and 2012 US Open Champion
Fred Smith, politician who served in the North Carolina Senate
Phil Spence, former college basketball coach and 1974 men's basketball NCAA Champion with NC State
Anne Tyler, Pulitzer Prize-winning author
Hubertus van der Vaart, Dutch American businessman, Rhodes Scholar, and Co-founder/Chairman of SEAF (Small Enterprise Assistance Funds)
Donald van der Vaart, chemical engineer and lawyer, former Secretary of the North Carolina Department of Environmental Quality
Blake Wayne Van Leer, former Commander and Captain in the U.S. Navy
Jesse Williams, high jumper who represented the USA at the 2008 Summer Olympics, 2011 high jump World Champion

References

External links

Broughton Athletics website

Wake County Public School System
Educational institutions established in 1929
Public high schools in North Carolina
Schools in Raleigh, North Carolina
 
International Baccalaureate schools in North Carolina
Magnet schools in North Carolina
1929 establishments in North Carolina